This is a list of members of the Senate of Lebanon, established in 1926 before being abolished the next year.

References 

Government of Lebanon